Elaine Forrestal (born 1941) is a Western Australian writer of books for children and young adults, including her 1996 book, Someone Like Me.

Career 
Elaine Forrestal was born in Perth, Western Australia in 1941. She graduated with a Bachelor of Education and Diploma of Teaching from Edith Cowan University. She worked as a school teacher prior to taking up full-time writing in 1999. She also holds a higher degree in creative writing from the University of Western Australia.

Forrestal began publishing short stories in 1983. The Watching Lake, published in 1991, was her first novel and was shortlisted for the 1992 Western Australian Premier's Book Awards.

In 2012 Forrestal was presented with the Muriel Barwell Award for Distinguished Service to Children's Literature by the Western Australian branch of the Children's Book Council of Australia.

Her papers, including manuscripts and correspondence, are held in the State Library of Western Australia.

Awards and recognition

Someone Like Me 

 Winner, West Australian Young Readers' Book Award – Hoffman Award, 1997
 Winner, CBCA Children's Book of the Year Award: Younger Readers, 1998
 Shortlisted, YABBA – Fiction for Older Readers, 1999

Selected works 

 The Watching Lake, Puffin, 1991
 Someone Like Me, Puffin, 1996
 Leaving No Footprints, Puffin, 2001
 Miss Llewellyn Jones, Fremantle Press, 2008
 Black Jack Anderson, Penguin, 2008
Goldfields Girl, Fremantle Press, 2020

References

External links 

 
 

1941 births
Living people
Australian children's writers
Edith Cowan University alumni
University of Western Australia alumni